Apollo Broadcast Investors, Inc. is a broadcast media company. Its head offices are located at Unit 1703, Cityland 10, Tower 1, H.V. De la Costa St., Makati. Apollo Broadcast owns and represents 2 radio companies: GV Radios Network Corporation (also known as GV Broadcasting System), which operates its flagship stations GVAM 792 and GVFM 99.1 in Pampanga; and Allied Broadcasting Center. It also owns Pinoy Xtreme Channel, a 24-hour sports and entertainment channel.

History
Prior to its current network, it was founded in 1983 as GV Broadcasting System by the Galang family. GV then operated its radio stations in Pampanga and later expanded in Batangas. GV's broadcast franchise was granted in 1995, and was later amended in 1998 allowing the inclusion of establishing its pay TV business.

In 2007, MediaQuest Holdings acquired a majority stake in GV and its parent Satventures, with the Galangs being part of MediaQuest. The Galangs later spun off its own radio assets into a new entity called Metro City Media Services.

In 2014, MCMS merged with the pay TV business of Apollo Global Corporation (the company whose associated with the Santa Ana racetrack owner Philippine Racing Club) to form Apollo Broadcast Investors. With this, the radio assets were became GV Radios Network Corporation while keeping its only pay TV channel Pinoy Xtreme.

Properties

Radio
Note: Mediascape serves as the licensee of these following stations.

Former stations

Pinoy Xtreme

Pinoy Xtreme is a 24-hour sports and entertainment cable channel. It is available via Channel 106 on Cignal (Nationwide), Channel 88 on G Sat (Nationwide), Channel 217 on SkyCable in Metro Manila, Channel 59 on Cablelink in Metro Manila and in various pay TV providers in key provinces.

Pinoy Xtreme's current programming consists of a variety of sports (boxing, extreme/combat sports, and cockfighting) and acquired programming from Leader News Philippines (such as Kamaong Asero). In some cases, the channel is timeshared with the live racetrack broadcasts of MJCI, MetroTurf and (the channel's former partner) PRCI, thus pre-empting its programming during live racing coverages at the discretion of a local pay TV provider.

References 

Mass media companies of the Philippines
Companies based in Angeles City
Companies based in Makati
Mass media in Angeles City
Mass media companies established in 1983
1983 establishments in the Philippines
Privately held companies